Jurven Koffy (born 28 September 1998) is a Bonarian footballer who plays as a midfielder for Atlétiko Flamingo.

Career statistics

International

International goals
Scores and results list Bonaire's goal tally first.

References

External links
 
 Jurven Koffy at CaribbeanFootballDatabase

1997 births
Living people
Bonaire footballers
Association football midfielders
Bonaire international footballers
SV Atlétiko Flamingo players